STRABAG SE is an Austrian construction company based in Spittal an der Drau, Austria, with its headquarters in Vienna. It is the largest construction company in Austria and one of the largest construction companies in Europe. The company is active in its home markets Austria and Germany and in all countries of Central, Eastern and South-East Europe, in selected markets in Western Europe, on the Arabian Peninsula, as well as in Canada, Chile, China and India. In these markets STRABAG has subsidiaries or operates on a project-basis.

History

Origins
The business has its origins in two businesses:

Baumeister Lerchbaumer-Isola-KG was founded by Anton Lerchbaumer (1879 - 1954) and his son-in-law, Franz Isola (1901 - 1968), in 1929. In 1954 Anton Lerchbaumer senior died. Franz Isola became the sole manager of the largest private building company in Austria. In 1968 Franz Isola died and Anton Lerchbaumer junior (1913 - 1974) became manager of the company. The company became known as ILBAU AG in 1972.

Strassenwalzenbetrieb was founded in 1895 and known as STRABAG from 1930.

Holocaust profiteering

Strabag was one of the main profiteers of the Nazi building projects during Second World War and before. It was a main contractor of Todt organisation and built concentration camps, the Westwall and Norway's Blood Road. The british Secret Service report concluded "[. . .] Enough large building firms offered their services to put the entire construction [of the Westwall, S.G.] on a voluntary basis. [. . .] Nor is there any basis later for assuming that firms in any large numbers became so reluctant to work for the OT as to make mass conscriptions of such concerns necessary. This willingness is due to the attractive profits obtainable from OT contracts."

Later history
These two businesses came under the common ownership of BIBAG Bauindustrie Beteiligungs Aktiengesellschaft (subsequently renamed STRABAG SE) – a company listed on the Vienna Stock Exchange – in 1998. In 1999, STRABAG acquired Strubag. In the same year, the company was delisted from the Vienna Stock exchange.

In 2000, the holding company Bauholding STRABAG (or STRABAG SE since 2006) started a strong brand strategy throughout Europe, unifying all under the core brand "STRABAG". In Austria ILBAU and STUAG merged into the new STRABAG AG. The following year, the holding company became the major shareholder in German company STRABAG AG (based in Cologne).

Subsequent acquisitions included Deutsche Asphalt GmbH in 2002, Walter Bau Group in 2005, a majority stake in Ed. Züblin in 2005, Adanti SpA, KIRCHNER Holding GmbH, F. Kirchhoff AG and Deutsche Telekom Immobilien und Service GmbH in 2008.

In 2007, STRABAG SE launched its initial public offering on the Vienna Stock exchange.

In December 2013 the Supreme Court of the Slovak Republic confirmed that one of the companies of the STRABAG Group participated in bid rigging cartel of construction companies (together with companies of Skanska group and Mota-Engil group) in 2004. Illegal conduct was associated with the tender for the execution of works for the construction of the D1 highway from Mengusovce to Jánovce in Eastern Slovakia.

Shareholders
Current stakeholders are Russian oligarch Oleg Deripaska's Cyprus based Rasperia Trading, Hans Peter Haselsteiner's holding company, the Raiffeisen-Holding Niederösterreich-Wien group and Raiffeisen Group  and UNIQA Group.

Management
The Chairman of the supervisory board is Alfred Gusenbauer. The business is managed by CEO Klemens Haselsteiner.

Structure
The company is organised into the following divisions: Building Construction & Civil Engineering, Transportation Infrastructure, Special Divisions & Concessions.

Major projects

Major projects have included the Alte Weser Lighthouse in the North Sea completed in 1964, Basra International Airport in Iraq completed in 1988, the Copenhagen Metro in Denmark completed in 2002, the Manapouri Second Tailrace Tunnel in New Zealand completed in 2002, the Sofia Airport Second Terminal in Bulgaria completed in 2006, the Vrmac Tunnel in Montenegro completed in 2007, the Limerick Tunnel in Ireland completed in 2010 and the Niagara Third Hydro Tunnel in Canada completed in 2013.

From 2012 to 2015, STRABAG worked on the rehabilitation and extension of the Bus Rapid Transit Infrastructure in Dar es Salaam.
STRABAG is also involved in HS2 lots S1 and S2, working as part of a joint venture, due to complete in 2031.

References

External links 

 
Vienna Stock Exchange: Market Data STRABAG SE

Construction and civil engineering companies of Austria
Companies established in 1835
Companies based in Vienna
1835 establishments in the Austrian Empire
Construction and civil engineering companies established in 1835